LVL may refer to:

 Laminated veneer lumber
 LVL (artist), an industrial/electronic artist from New York
 "LVL", a song by American rapper ASAP Rocky from his 2013 debut album Long. Live. ASAP
 LVL, ISO 4217 currency code for Latvian lats, the former currency of Latvia

See also
 Laval, Quebec, a city in Quebec, Canada
 Level (disambiguation)